The 2018 NWSL College Draft was the sixth annual meeting of National Women's Soccer League (NWSL) franchises to select eligible college players. It was held on January 18, 2018 at the United Soccer Coaches Convention in Philadelphia, Pennsylvania.

Format
Draft order was determined by the final 2017 regular season standings.

Results

Key

Picks

Notable undrafted players
Below is a list of undrafted rookies who appeared in a competitive NWSL game in 2018.

Trades

Round 1:

Round 2:

Round 3:

Round 4:

Summary
In 2018, a total of 27 colleges had players selected. Of these, six had a player drafted to the NWSL for the first time: Alabama, Oregon State, TCU, UC Irvine, Washington and Yale.

Schools with multiple draft selections

Selections by college athletic conference

Selections by position

Notes

See also
 List of NWSL drafts
 List of National Women's Soccer League draftees by college team
 2017 National Women's Soccer League season

References

External links

National Women's Soccer League drafts
College Draft
NWSL College Draft
NWSL College Draft
Soccer in Pennsylvania
Sports in Philadelphia
Events in Philadelphia
NWSL College Draft